Hon. Havea Tui'ha'ateiho  (17 March 1910 – 4 February 1962) was a Tongan nobleman and politician. He held several ministerial posts, including serving as Deputy Premier.

Biography
Tui'ha'ateiho was born Sione Fatukimotulalo, the son of Hon. Havea Tui'ha'ateiho Kelepi Fulilangi Havea (1874–1940) and Sinalauli'i Mafile'o (1878–1928). He was educated at Tupou College and Newington College in Australia, where he studied under the name John Fatu from 1919 until 1922.

In 1923 he joined the civil service, working as a clerk. He became Governor of Vavaʻu in 1929, and then Governor of Haʻapai in 1932. In 1933 he married Leafa'itulangi Seumanutafa, the daughter of a Samoan Chief.

Tui'ha'ateiho joined the cabinet in 1946 as Acting Minister of Police. In the same year he was appointed Minister of Lands and Works. In 1949 he became Minister of Works, before being appointed Deputy Premier in 1953. He retired in 1960.

Tui'ha'ateiho died in February 1962 and was given a state funeral.

References

1910 births
People educated at Newington College
Tongan Methodists
Tongan nobles
Tongan civil servants
Members of the Legislative Assembly of Tonga
Government ministers of Tonga
Deputy Prime Ministers of Tonga
1962 deaths